Raksel is a Rajput clan. They are the descendants of the Haihaiyavanshi. The Raksel Rajputs ruled several states in India (mainly in Chhattisgarh and Jharkhand) during the Middle Ages and British rule, including Surguja State and Udaipur. Raksel Rajput Raja Man Singh was  ruling Palamu prior to the rule of the Chero dynasty.

According to Nagvanshavali, the Raksel of Surguja the descendants of Kalachuris invaded Chotanagpur with 12000 cavalry, but Nagvanshi king Bhim Karn defeated them and conquered the territory of Palamu upto Barwe.

A Chero chief of Shahabad, Bhagwant Rai, took service under the Raksel Rajput chief Man Singh of Palamu. Bhagwant Rai assassinated Man Singh, taking advantage of the local Raja's absence at a ceremony at Surguja to raise the standard of revolt and founded his own kingdom around 1572.

References

Dynasties of India
History of Chhattisgarh
Rajput clans
Rajput clans of Jharkhand